The 1999 FIVB Volleyball Boys' U19 World Championship was held in Riyadh, Saudi Arabia.

Final standing
Final Standings results are given below

References

 

1999 in volleyball
FIVB Volleyball Boys' U19 World Championship
2009 in Saudi Arabian sport
International sports competitions hosted by Saudi Arabia